The Gymnasium of Kaunas University of Technology (KTUG), formerly Kaunas Polytechnical Institute Experimental Secondary School, is Lithuania's first university-supported secondary school for gifted pupils.

The gymnasium was established by Kaunas University of Technology (KTU) in 1989 and adopted its current name in 1990.  It serves students from across Lithuania, and its first graduating class left in 1991. The school has two first-year classes and three-second-, third-, and fourth-year classes.

The school has 38 teaching staff, including 16 KTU lecturers. The school is located on the KTU campus, allowing it to use University laboratories and sport facilities.

History
Kaunas University of Technology Gymnasium is a high school which was founded in 1989. It was initially a project of helping extraordinary kids learn sophisticated material in order to prepare for University and achieve worldwide results. The high school was legally confirmed as a gymnasium in 1992. The school has close ties with KTU allowing students to participate in numerous University events.

Enrolment
KTUG is famous for its application rate. On average, 20% of applicants are accepted each year to the first grade (9th grade or freshmen year) of Gymnasium. In total, four exams, including maths, Lithuanian, English and natural science have to be taken in order to apply for this school. Moreover, 5 so called Science Leader Tournaments (Mokslo lyderių turnyrai) are held throughout each year. There, students can examine their capabilities of solving all sorts of tasks. Each competition consists of two tests, the topic of a test (usually a class like maths, English, natural sciences, Lithuanian, or history) is not known until the start of it, so a student-to-be cannot prepare for it without preparing for all the subjects. 15 students that got highest scores during the Science Leader Tournaments are invited to the school and do not need to hold an entry test.

Principals
 1990–2014 Bronislovas Burgis
 2015–current Tomas Kivaras

The winners of international olympiads
Teaching exceptionally gifted students is a prioritized sphere of education which enables students to utilize their full potential and talent.  Pupils representing the Gymnasium have won 105 medals and 20 honorary certificates in global student Olympiads: 
 Natural sciences − 30 medals (4 golds, 17 silvers, 10 bronzes)
 Information sciences − 20 medals (9 silvers, 11 bronzes)
 Chemistry − 18 medals (4 golds, 9 silvers, 5 bronzes) and 2 honorary certificates
 Mathematics − 14 medals (1 gold, 2 silvers, 11 bronzes) and 13 honorary certificates
 Biology − 7 medals (1 silver, 6 bronzes)
 Debates − 3 medals (2 golds, 1 bronze)
 Astrophysics − 3 medals (1 gold, 1 silver, 1 bronze)
 Physics − 3 medals (3 bronzes) and 5 honorary certificates
 History – 2 medals (1 gold, 1 bronze)
 Geography – 3 medals (2 silvers, 1 bronze)

Alumni
 Dr. Audrius Alkauskas (born 1978) - physicist. 
 Dr. Giedrius Alkauskas (born 1978) - mathematician, musicologist, composer.
 Dr. Kęstutis Česnavičius (born 1989) - mathematician.
 Dr. Nojus Tomsonas (born 1994) - mathematician.
 Dr. Nerijus Mačiulis (born 1979) – economist.
 Liutauras Ulevičius (born 1980) – legal scholar, blogger, PR/PA professional.
 Salomėja Zaksaitė (born 1985) – chess player (WIM), legal scholar and criminologist.

Presidents
 1997/1998 Liutauras Ulevičius
 1998/1999 Remigijus Staniulis
 2003/2005 Audrius Židonis
 2008/2009 Vaiva Jakutytė
 2009/2010 Gabrielė Jagelavičiūtė
 2010/2011 Snaigė Židonytė
 2011/2012 Enrikas Etneris
 2012/2013 Marija Šmulkštytė
 2013/2014 Andrius Kriukas
 2014/2015 Vainius Podolinskis
 2015/2016 Ieva Šalnaitė
 2016/2017 Luka Kemežytė
 2017/2018 Dovydas Januška
 2018/2019 Gabija Vasiliauskaitė
 2019/2020 Vykintas Vaitkus
 2020/2021 Austėja Lazaravičiūtė

External links

 Kaunas University of Technology Gymnasium (Lithuanian)

Educational institutions established in 1989
Kaunas University of Technology
Gymnasiums in Kaunas
1989 establishments in the Soviet Union